Mientras Haya Vida is a Mexican telenovela.

Story
The story revolves around the culture shock between two disparate worlds: That of the rich and the powerful versus that of the ordinary, everyday folk (a world where opportunities are virtually non-existent). And in the middle of both worlds, the one thing that most people in both worlds desire, true love.  The powerful that loses everything, except his dignity, and a woman that has almost everything, except money.

It is the story of Héctor Cervantes, the powerful owner of the most important construction and engineering group in Mexico, INMEX.  Hector is a widower.  A solitary man that can do just about anything at the snap of his fingers.  He becomes a fortress after the suicide of his wife Graciela.  Hector is a powerful man, but behind his empire there are many secrets that haunt him.  And for someone so powerful, these secrets will come back to haunt him, as his closest allies are his worst enemies.  His friends and family will turn on him leaving him broke and without knowing what happened, or why.

It is also the story of Maria Montero, an abandoned housewife and mother of three young daughters, Elisa, Georgina (Gina) and Emiliana.  Maria lives alone with her three daughters in a multifamily condominium complex in Mexico City.  She owns a small "fonda" and basically lives to survive.  Elisa is an architecture student at the UNAM. Gina is the wild and rebellious middle child.  Emiliana is the youngest of the three... she has been sick since she was very little due to a fever and needs constant medical attention.

The lives of Hector and Maria come together as Maria tries to save her small condominium from being destroyed by the biggest project being planned by INMEX at the location where the complex lies.

Cast
 Margarita Rosa de Francisco - Maria Montero
 Saul Lisazo - Hector Cervantes
 Paola Núñez - Elisa Montero
 Andres Palacios - Sergio Juarez
 Romina Gaetani - Romina Saenz
 Tomy Dunster - Alejandro Cervantes
 Hector Arredondo - Gael Cervantes
 Carmen Beato - Elena
 Anna Ciocchetti - Marion
 Farnesio de Bernal - Lorenzo
 Carmen Madrid - Natalia
 Carlos Torres Torrija - Leonardo Montero
 Marimar Vega - Gina Montero
 Alicia Zapien - Emiliana Montero
 Eric Hayser - Daniel
 Alan Ciangherotti - Julio
 Carolina Cartagena - Chabela
 Mayra Sierra - Ofelia
 Ana Ofelia Murguia - Toto
 Fernando Ciangherotti - Gonzalo
 Ari Telch - Ignacio

External links

Official website

2007 telenovelas
2008 telenovelas
2007 Mexican television series debuts
2008 Mexican television series endings
Mexican telenovelas
Spanish-language telenovelas
TV Azteca telenovelas